The Battle of Bergamo was fought between Alans and the Western Roman Empire in 464, and resulted in a Roman victory.

In 464, the Alan king Beorgor led an invasion of Northern Italy, marching his force into the Po Valley. At Bergamo, near Milan, Beorgor was confronted by the Roman general Ricimer on 6 February 464. After fierce fighting, the Alans were defeated and Beorgor was killed.

Sources
 

464
Battles involving the Alans
Battles involving the Roman Empire
Bergamo
Military history of Italy